Purple Heart Trail can refer to:

Interstate 5 in California, Oregon and Washington
Interstate 10 in Alabama and Arizona
Interstate 15 in Montana
Interstate 115 in Montana
Interstate 315 in Montana
Interstate 35 in Kansas and Texas
Interstate 135 in Kansas
Interstate 235 in Kansas
Interstate 335 in Kansas
Interstate 435 in Kansas
Interstate 635 in Kansas
Interstate 40 in Arizona, Arkansas, Oklahoma and New Mexico
Interstate 44 in Missouri
Interstate 64 in Kentucky, West Virginia, and Virginia
Interstate 65 in Alabama
Interstate 265 in Kentucky
Interstate 70 in Colorado, Kansas, Missouri and Ohio
Interstate 470 in Kansas
Interstate 670 in Kansas
Interstate 71 in Ohio
Interstate 72 in Illinois
Interstate 75 in Florida
Interstate 80 in California, Nevada, Utah and Wyoming
Interstate 84 in parts of New York
Interstate 90 in Idaho, Montana, South Dakota and Wyoming
Interstate 94 in Montana and Minnesota
Interstate 95 in Maryland, New Hampshire, North Carolina, Rhode Island, South Carolina and parts of Virginia
State Route 232 in Georgia
Interstate A-2 in Alaska

Historic trails and roads in the United States
Trail